Senatore is a surname. Notable people with the surname include:

Ambra Senatore (born 1976), Italian choreographer, researcher and educator 
Leonardo Senatore (born 1984), Argentine rugby union player
Lorenzo Senatore, ICG, AIC (born 1974), Italian cinematographer
Paola Senatore (born 1949), Italian former film actress 
Pat Senatore (born 1935), American jazz bassist
Pedro Senatore Ramos (born 1968), Ecuadorian footballer
Sebastian Senatore (born 1985), Swedish/Uruguayan Soccer player